Minty Fresh is a Chicago-based record label, founded in 1993 by Jim Powers with Anthony Musiala. The label is known for launching the careers of Veruca Salt. They also gave the Swedish band The Cardigans their first US release and released the debut single by Liz Phair. They also run the "Mini Fresh" label which produces children's music.

Artists 

 All India Radio
 The Aluminum Group
 Lindsay Anderson
 Astrid Swan
 Axe Riverboy
 Bark Bark Disco
 Beangrowers
 Bettie Serveert
 The Cardigans
 The Children's Hour
 Andrew Deadman
 Desperate Journalist
 Doktor Kosmos
 Drew Andrews
 Every Good Boy
 Ezra Furman and the Harpoons
 Firefox AK
 Floraline
 Fonda
 Friend + Doktor Kosmos
 Fugu
 The Hit Parade
 HushPuppies
 Husky Rescue
 Ivy
 Kahimi Karie
 Klee
 Komeda
 The Legendary Jim Ruiz Group
 Light FM
 The Living Blue
 Liz Phair
 Love Jones
 Mastretta
 Melony
 Mike Scott
 Miou Miou
 Musique Le Pop
 The Orange Peels
 Papas Fritas
 The Poems
 Prototypes
 Sepiatone
 Sarah Shannon
 Sébastien Schuller
 Sleep Thieves
 Soy Un Caballo
 Stump The Host
 Suburban Kids with Biblical Names
 The Sugarplastic
 Tahiti 80
 Trost
 Veruca Salt
 The Waterboys
 White Shoes & The Couples Company
 Zeshan B

See also
 List of record labels

References

External links
Official site

American independent record labels
Record labels established in 1993
Alternative rock record labels
Indie rock record labels
Companies based in Chicago
1993 establishments in Illinois